Lymantes scrobicollis is a species of true weevil in the family Curculionidae, found in North America.

References

Further reading

 
 

Molytinae
Articles created by Qbugbot
Beetles described in 1838